Cerithiopsis balaustium is a species of sea snail, a gastropod in the family Cerithiopsidae. It was described by Figueira and Pimenta in 2008.

References

balaustium
Gastropods described in 2008